"Hopscotch" is a single by Danish singer-songwriter Emmelie de Forest. It was released on 10 August 2015 as a digital download in Denmark. The song was written by Emmelie de Forest, Tore Nissen, and Ali Zuckowski.

Music video
The music video was released on August 27, 2015. The video was filmed in Rome, Italy the month before its release.

Track listing

Release history

References

2015 songs
2015 singles
Songs written by Emmelie de Forest